Ghari Matani is a village in Chach Valley of Attock District in Punjab Province of Pakistan. It is situated to the south of the Indus River and has fertile lands.
  
The population is predominantly Pashtun of Yusufzai and Abdali extraction and speak Pashto dialect of the Yusufzai tribe. There are a minority of Kashmiris living there also. Some notable inscription are located in this area.

References

Villages in Attock District